Lakewood Gardens was a census-designated place in Palm Beach County, Florida, United States. Its population was 1,273 as of the 2010 census. In 2011, the area was annexed by the village of Palm Springs.

References

Former census-designated places in Palm Beach County, Florida
Former census-designated places in Florida